Great Meadows is an unincorporated community and census-designated place (CDP) located within Independence Township in Warren County, New Jersey, United States, that was created as part of the 2010 United States Census. As of the 2010 census, the CDP's population was 303.

Until the 2000 United States Census, the CDP was combined as part of the Great Meadows-Vienna CDP. Effective with the 2010 census, the Great Meadows-Vienna CDP was split into its components, Vienna (with a 2010 Census population of 981) and Great Meadows. As of the 2000 United States Census, the population of the combined Great Meadows-Vienna CDP was 1,264.

Geography
According to the United States Census Bureau, the CDP had a total area of 1.579 square miles (4.090 km2), including 1.565 square miles (4.054 km2) of land and 0.014 square miles (0.035 km2) of water (0.86%).

Demographics

Census 2000
As of the 2000 United States Census, the population for ZIP Code Tabulation Area 07838 was 3,149.

Census 2010

Notable people

People who were born in, residents of, or otherwise closely associated with Great Meadows include:
 Bobby Caldwell (1951–2023), singer, songwriter, and musician, best known for his signature song "What You Won't Do for Love"
 Cole Kimball (born 1985), pitcher drafted by the Washington Nationals.

References

Census-designated places in Warren County, New Jersey
Independence Township, New Jersey